The 1922 Australian federal election was held in Australia on 16 December 1922. All 75 seats in the House of Representatives, and 19 of the 36 seats in the Senate were up for election. The incumbent Nationalist Party, led by Prime Minister Billy Hughes lost its majority. However, the opposition Labor Party led by Matthew Charlton did not take office as the Nationalists sought a coalition with the fledgling Country Party led by Earle Page. The Country Party made Hughes's resignation the price for joining, and Hughes was replaced as Nationalist leader by Stanley Bruce.

Future Prime Minister Frank Forde and future opposition leader John Latham both entered parliament at this election.

At this election, Hughes as the sitting prime minister made his second seat transfer, in this case, from Bendigo to North Sydney.
Hughes had held Bendigo since transferring there from West Sydney at the 1917 election also as the sitting prime minister.

Hughes remains the only sitting Prime Minister to transfer to another seat, not once but twice.

Aside from the 1917 and 1922 elections, all other elections have seen the sitting prime minister recontest the seat that they held prior to the election.

Results

House of Representatives

Notes
Independents: William Watson (Fremantle, WA)
Five members were elected unopposed – one Labor, two Nationalist, one Country, and one Liberal.

Senate

Seats changing hands

 Members listed in italics did not contest their seat at this election.
 *Alexander Hay contested his seat as an independent

Post-election pendulum

See also
 Candidates of the 1922 Australian federal election
 Members of the Australian House of Representatives, 1922–1925
 Members of the Australian Senate, 1923–1926

Endnotes
Notes

Citations

References
University of WA election results in Australia since 1890
Two-party-preferred vote since 1919

Federal elections in Australia
1922 elections in Australia
December 1922 events